Lant Pritchett (born 1959) is an American development economist. He is the RISE Research Director at the Blavatnik School of Government, University of Oxford.

He was born in Utah in 1959 and raised in Boise, Idaho. He graduated from Brigham Young University in 1983 with a B.S. in economics, after serving a mission for the Church of Jesus Christ of Latter-day Saints in Argentina (1978–1980). He graduated from the Massachusetts Institute of Technology in 1988 with a PhD in economics.

He worked for the World Bank from 1988 to 2000 and from 2004 to 2007. He was a contributor to the first Copenhagen Consensus. In 1991 he said that he wrote the controversial Summers memo that supposedly advocated the exportation of polluting industries to poor countries, for which Summers was receiving widespread criticism. From 2000 to 2004 he was a lecturer in public policy at the John F. Kennedy School of Government at Harvard University. He is currently a professor of the practice of economic development at the Kennedy School of Government.

In 2006 he published his first monograph  Let Their People Come: Breaking the Gridlock on Global Labor Mobility  (Center for Global Development, pub).  The book references research that Pritchett did with Michael Clemens and others at the CGD on the place premium, income per natural, and other related concepts. He argues that the most effective way the developed world can help impoverished countries is to allow increased numbers of low skilled laborers to immigrate as guest workers.  He describes what he sees as an immoral cycle of using ever more sophisticated technology to reduce labor while billions of willing workers live in extreme poverty. He is on the Board of Advisors for IDinsight.

His proposal to monitor global poverty with a low and high poverty line has been adopted by some organizations including Our World in Data.

Pritchett Test
Pritchett recently proposed a four-part "smell test" for pro-development policies. The 'test' isn't a pure post-hoc impact assessment, but specifically addresses whether a pro-development policy should be implemented or changed at all. Notable growth economist Paul Romer summarizes the four criteria, using X as the variable targeted by policy:
 In a cross-sectional comparison of levels, do countries that are more developed have more X?
 In cross-sectional comparison of growth rates, do countries that have rapid growth in X also tend to experience a rapid increase in standards of living?
 When we look at the few countries for which we have long historical records, do the ones that become much more developed also acquire much more X?
 If we look for countries that switch from a regime of slow economic development to a regime of rapid development, do we see a parallel shift in the rate of growth of change in X?

References

External links
 lantpritchett.org (personal website)
 .
 .
 .
 Ending Global Apartheid 2008 interview in Reason

1959 births
Economists from Idaho
Brigham Young University alumni
Harvard Kennedy School faculty
Living people
MIT School of Humanities, Arts, and Social Sciences alumni
American Mormon missionaries in Argentina
People from Boise, Idaho
Latter Day Saints from Massachusetts
20th-century Mormon missionaries
Education economists
Latter Day Saints from Idaho
Center for Global Development
20th-century American economists
21st-century American economists
Migration economists